Larry E. Greiner (December 6, 1933 -) is an American economist, former Professor of Management and Organizations at University of Southern California USC Marshall School of Business.

Academic background 
Greiner bachelor's degree from the University of Kansas at a young age first. In 1958, Greiner entered Harvard Business School, and where he received an MBA within 2 years, DBA from Harvard Business School in 1966 again.

Greiner's growth model 

In 1972, Greiner proposed the Greiner's growth model, using five key concepts: the age of the organization, the size of the organization, the stage of evolution, the stage of revolution and the growth rate of the industry. Divide it into six phases (Only five phases when proposed in 1972, and a sixth phases was added in 1998), and proposed two key concepts: Evolution and Revolution. This directly illuminates how organizations overcome growth crises, while their respective resolution strategies form the basis for re-emerging crises.
Phase 1─Creativity:Everyone knows everything and there is a lot of discussion and mutual information. But as the organization gradually grows, the information received by the participants begins to be overloaded, and their growth will encounter a crisis of leadership.
Phase 2─Direction:As organizations grow, decision makers are overloaded with work due to the necessity of control and the lack of self-control of employees, and their growth will encounter a crisis of autonomy.
Phase 3─Delegation:Organizational sub-areas or tasks are handed (missions, responsibilities and permissions) over and performed by others, and their growth will encounter a crisis of control.
Phase 4─Coordination:Projects and tasks of various departments are coordinated with each other. However, this coordination by vote may lead to the organization becoming bureaucratic, and their growth will encounter a crisis of red tape.
Phase 5─Collaboration:Reduced friction costs for organizations, and their growth will encounter a crisis of growth.
Phase 6─Alliances:Organizations their growth will encounter a crisis of identity. Which was added the phase in 1998.

References

Further reading 
 Evolution and Revolution as Organizations Grow, in: Mainiero, L. and Tromley, C.  Developing Managerial Skills in Organizational Behavior:  Exercises, Cases, and Readings (Englewood Cliffs, NJ: Prentice Hall) (2nd ed. 1994), S. 322–329 (zuerst in Harvard Business Review 1972, July – August, S. 37–46)
 (mit Virginia E. Schein), Power and Organization Development: Mobilizing Power to Implement Change. Prentice Hall Organizational Development Series, FT Press 1988

External links 
 

1933 births
Living people
20th-century American economists
University of Southern California faculty
Harvard Business School alumni